Buccinulum robustum is a species of marine gastropod mollusc in the family Buccinidae. It was first described by Baden Powell in 1929. It is endemic to the waters of New Zealand.

Description

Buccinulum robustum is typically between 13 and 15 mm in length, and can grow up to 20.6 mm by 9 mm. It is recognisable by its strong axial ribs. Specimens vary in colour from black and pink to uniformly white. Some specimens of Buccinulum robustum were originally described as two different species (Buccinulum robustum and Buccinulum suteri), with the name Buccinulum suteri given to specimens with finer spiral sculptures. Buccinulum suteri was later synonymised with Buccinulum robustum.

Distribution
The species is Endemic to New Zealand. The holotype was first identified at Port Fitzroy on Great Barrier Island. While primarily found on the east coast of the North Island, in 1995 the first specimens were identified to the west of the Aupouri Peninsula.

References

Buccinidae
Gastropods described in 1929
Gastropods of New Zealand
Endemic fauna of New Zealand
Endemic molluscs of New Zealand
Molluscs of the Pacific Ocean
Taxa named by Arthur William Baden Powell